The following article presents a summary of the 2011 football (soccer) season in Brazil, which was the 110th season of competitive football in the country.

Campeonato Brasileiro Série A

The 2011 Campeonato Brasileiro Série A started on May 21, 2011, and concluded on December 4, 2011.

Corinthians declared as the Campeonato Brasileiro Série A champions.

Relegation
The four worst placed teams, which are Atlético Paranaense, Ceará, América (MG) and Avaí, were relegated to the following year's second level.

Campeonato Brasileiro Série B

The 2011 Campeonato Brasileiro Série B started on May 6, 2011, and concluded on November 26, 2011.

Portuguesa declared as the Campeonato Brasileiro Série B champions.

Promotion
The four best placed teams, which are Portuguesa, Náutico, Ponte Preta and Sport, were promoted to the following year's first level.

Relegation
The four worst placed teams, which are Icasa, Vila Nova, Salgueiro and Duque de Caxias, were relegated to the following year's third level.

Campeonato Brasileiro Série C

The 2011 Campeonato Brasileiro Série C started on July 16, 2011, and concluded on December 3, 2011. The Campeonato Brasileiro Série C final was played between Joinville and CRB.

Joinville declared as the league champions by aggregate score of 7–1.

Participating teams

 América (RN)
 Águia de Marabá
 Araguaína
 Brasil de Pelotas
 Brasiliense
 Campinense
 Caxias
 Chapecoense
 CRB
 Fortaleza
 Guarany de Sobral
 Ipatinga
 Joinville
 Luverdense
 Madureira
 Macaé
 Marília
 Paysandu
 Rio Branco (AC)
 Santo André

Promotion
The four best placed teams, which are Joinville, CRB, Ipatinga and América (RN), were promoted to the following year's second level.

Relegation
The four worst placed teams, which are Campinense, Marília, Brasil de Pelotas and Araguaína, were relegated to the following year's fourth level.

Campeonato Brasileiro Série D

The 2011 Campeonato Brasileiro Série D started on July 18, 2011, and concluded on November 20, 2011.

Participating teams

 Alecrim
 Anapolina
 Audax Rio
 Bahia de Feira
 Brusque
 CENE
 Cerâmica
 Cianorte
 Comercial (PI)
 Coruripe
 Cruzeiro (PA)
 Cuiabá
 Formosa
 Gama
 Guarani de Juazeiro
 Independente
 Itumbiara 
 Juventude
 Metropolitano
 Mirassol
 Nacional (AM)
 Oeste
 Operário (PR)
 Penarol
 Plácido de Castro
 Porto
 River Plate
 Sampaio Corrêa
 Santa Cruz
 Santa Cruz (RS)
 São Mateus
 São Raimundo (PA)
 Tocantinópolis
 Trem
 Treze
 Tupi
 Vila Aurora
 Villa Nova
 Vitória da Conquista
 Volta Redonda

The Campeonato Brasileiro Série D final was played between Tupi and Santa Cruz.

Tupi declared as the league champions by aggregate score of 3–0.

Promotion
The four best placed teams, which are Tupi, Santa Cruz, Cuiabá and Oeste, were promoted to the following year's third level.

Copa do Brasil

The 2011 Copa do Brasil started on February 16, 2011, and concluded on June 8, 2011. The Copa do Brasil final was played between Vasco and Coritiba.

Vasco declared as the cup champions on the away goal rule by aggregate score of 3–3.

State championship champions

Youth competition champions

Other competition champions

Brazilian clubs in international competitions

Brazil national team
The following table lists all the games played by the Brazilian national team in official competitions and friendly matches during 2011.

Women's football

National team
The following table lists all the games played by the Brazil women's national football team in official competitions and friendly matches during 2011.

The Brazil women's national football team competed in the following competitions in 2011:

Copa do Brasil de Futebol Feminino

The 2011 Copa do Brasil de Futebol Feminino started on August 18, 2011, and concluded on November 26, 2011.

Foz Cataratas declared as the cup champions by aggregate score of 5–0.

Domestic competition champions

Other competition champions

Brazilian clubs in international competitions

References

 Brazilian competitions at RSSSF

 
Seasons in Brazilian football
Brazil